The Methodist Episcopal Church of Wessington Springs is a church at the southeast corner of Main Street and State Avenue in Wessington Springs, South Dakota.  It was designed in 1913 by Kirby T Snyder in a Late Gothic Revival style. The building was added to the National Register of Historic Places in 1999.

It has also been known as First United Methodist Church.

References

Methodist churches in South Dakota
Churches on the National Register of Historic Places in South Dakota
Gothic Revival church buildings in South Dakota
Churches completed in 1913
Buildings and structures in Jerauld County, South Dakota
1913 establishments in South Dakota
National Register of Historic Places in Jerauld County, South Dakota